Rotundu is a flat, heavily forested peak on the side of Mount Kenya. The flat land on the peak also hosts Lake Rotundu (. Some of the plants found on the peak are puzzling, as one would not expect to find them growing at that altitude.

References

Mountains of Kenya